The PDC Awards Dinner is an awards ceremony organised by the Professional Darts Corporation. It is held at the Dorchester Hotel in London. It has been held annually since 2007.

Awards

Player of the Year
PDC Player of the Year is the most prestigious award presented at the annual Awards Dinner. Only six different players have received the award, with Phil Taylor and Michael van Gerwen both getting the honour a record six times.

Young Player of the Year
The PDC Young Player of the Year award is bestowed upon a young player who has shown success on the circuit that year. Although there is no strict age cutoff for the award, honorees have historically been 25 years of age or under.

PDPA Players' Player of the Year
The second most prestigious award of the Awards Dinner, the PDPA Players' Player of the Year is voted on by fellow PDPA members (PDC tour card holders) each year. Michael van Gerwen has won the award a record three times.

Fans' Player of the Year
The PDC Fans' Player of the Year has been awarded each year of the Awards Dinner to the player receiving the most votes via online poll. Phil Taylor has won the award a record five times, with consecutive seasons 2007–2011.

Best Newcomer
PDC Best Newcomer has been awarded in most editions of the Awards Dinner, with the award going to a player with an outstanding debut year in the PDC. It was not awarded in 2014 or 2017, where it was replaced by the  award.

Best ProTour Player
A variation of Best ProTour Player has been awarded to a player with outstanding performance on the PDC Pro Tour each year since the inception of the PDC Awards Dinner in 2007. The award was presented as "Best Floor Player" in 2007 and 2008, and has been awarded as "Pro Tour Player of the Year" or "Best Pro Tour Player" since 2009. Michael van Gerwen has been presented the award a record five times, coinciding with his winning of a record 75 Pro Tour titles.

Televised Performance of the Year
Televised Performance of the Year is awarded to a player who has won a televised match (or entire tournament in the 2016 case) that makes for a great performance. Only James Wade and Adrian Lewis have received the award twice. Notably, Michael van Gerwen has never won the award, but has been on the losing end of six different matches that did.

PDC Nine-Dart Club

The PDC awards gold pins to players that threw televised nine-darters over the year, and silver pins to those that threw non-televised nine-darters. There have been 343 total nine-darters thrown by 167 different players in PDC events. 53 of the PDC nine-darters were televised, with an additional 39 that have been thrown on streamed boards of the Pro Tour that are not included in the televised lists. Michael van Gerwen holds the record for PDC nine-darters, with 24 perfect games in PDC tournaments. A record 47 nine-darters were during the 2019 season, though only one of them was televised. James Wade has been on the receiving end of a record 11 nine-darters, notably including the first double-start perfect game by Brendan Dolan at the World Grand Prix, and two perfect games in one match by Phil Taylor in the 2010 Premier League.

Most Improved Player
UK Open semi-finalist Peter Wright was named 2013 Most Improved Player, and European Championship runner up Mensur Suljović was named the 2016 Most Improved Player.

PDC Hall of Fame
In 2005, the PDC introduced a Hall of Fame to recognise individuals with noteworthy contributions to darts. The first two inductees were Eric Bristow and John Lowe, great rivals throughout the eighties and early nineties – at least one of these two players managed to reach the World Championship Final each year for the first 14 incarnations of the World Professional Darts Championship, from 1978 to 1991, with three being played against each other. As of 2007, Hall of Fame inductees are now announced at the PDC Awards Dinner. The inductees comprise players, officials, administrators, commentators, and presenters that have contributed to the sport of darts and the success of the PDC.

2023
The 2023 PDC Awards were announced on 31 January 2023 to commemorate PDC players for their performance in the 2022 season. No ceremony took place, with all the awards being announced on the PDC's social media channels.

2022
The 2022 PDC Awards were announced on 27 January 2022 to commemorate PDC players for their performance in the 2021 season. No ceremony took place, with all the awards being announced on the PDC's social media channels.

2021
The 2021 PDC Awards Ceremony was held on 25 January 2021 to commemorate PDC players for their performance in the 2020 season. The ceremony was notably held online due to the COVID-19 pandemic.

2020
The 2020 PDC Awards Dinner was held on 30 January 2020 to commemorate PDC players for their performance in the 2019 season.

2019
The 2019 PDC Awards Dinner was held on 21 January 2019 to commemorate PDC players for their performance in the 2018 season.

2018
The 2018 PDC Awards Dinner was held on 22 January 2018 to commemorate PDC players for their performance in the 2017 season. Newly crowned World Champion Rob Cross received four awards to commemorate his outstanding debut season on the PDC tour, but was unable to edge out world number one Michael van Gerwen, who scooped seven premier titles over the season to win a third consecutive Player of the Year award.

2017
The 2017 PDC Awards Dinner was held on 4 January 2017 to commemorate PDC players for their performance in the 2016 season. Michael van Gerwen reigned in four awards after capping off a 25 title season with his second World Championship victory.

2016
The 2016 PDC Awards Dinner was held on 21 January 2016 to commemorate PDC players for their performance in the 2015 season.

2015
The 2015 PDC Awards Dinner was held on 22 January 2015 to commemorate PDC players for their performance in the 2014 season. Newly crowned World Champion Gary Anderson became just the second player (after Phil Taylor) to sweep the four senior categories PDC, PDPA, Fans’, and Pro Tour Players of the year. James Wade secured the Televised Performance of the Year with his stunning comeback from 9–2 down to win the Masters final 11–10 over Mervyn King.

2014
The 2014 PDC Awards Dinner was held on 20 January 2014 to commemorate PDC players for their performance in the 2013 season.

2013
The 2013 PDC Awards Dinner was held on 2 January 2013 to commemorate PDC players for their performance in the 2012 season.

2012
The 2012 PDC Awards Dinner was held on 3 January 2012 to commemorate PDC players for their performance in the 2011 season. For the fourth year running, Phil Taylor picked up the titles of Player of the Year, and Fans' Player of the year, having won five majors during 2011. Justin Pipe was named PDPA Players' Player of the Year, and Gary Anderson picked up the and Pro Tour Player of the Year title, having each won three and seven Pro Tour titles respectively. Adrian Lewis' five straight set comeback from 5–1 down to overcome James Wade in the World Championship semi-final earned the reigning world champion his second consecutive Televised Performance of the Year title. The 2012 Awards Dinner would also mark the first in a long line of awards for Michael van Gerwen, who this year picked up the Young Player of the Year award.

2011
The 2011 PDC Awards Dinner was held on 4 January 2011 to commemorate PDC players for their performance in the 2010 season.

2010
The 2010 PDC Awards Dinner was held on 5 January 2010 to commemorate PDC players for their performance in the 2009 season. For the second consecutive year, Phil Taylor picked up four senior awards after he won seven major titles, 12 Pro Tour events, and capped his season with his 15th World Championship title.

2009
The 2009 PDC Awards Dinner was held on 7 January 2009 to commemorate PDC players for their performance in the 2008 season.

2008
The second annual PDC Awards Dinner was held on 9 January 2008 to commemorate PDC players for their performance in the 2007 season. James Wade picked up the top two awards after following his victories in the World Matchplay and World Grand Prix. The dinner was present to drama with the PDC receiving complaints about the conduct of Jason Clark, who was being inducted into the  after hitting a nine-dart finish at the 2007 German Darts Championship. The darts regulation authority was asked to investigate, and Clark received a suspension followed by a one year ban and £500 fine.

2007
The inaugural PDC Awards Dinner was held on 9 January 2007 to commemorate PDC players for their performance in the 2006 season. The top two awards went to Phil Taylor and Dennis Priestley, who shared twelve PDC World Titles between the pair, and had met in five world finals. Taylor edged out recently crowned world champion and 2006 UK Open winner Raymond van Barneveld with victories in five televised tournaments and a slew of high averages. Van Barneveld did come out with more hardware however, picking up the Fan's Player of the Year and Best Newcomer awards in addition to a gold pin for a televised nine-darter in the Premier League.

References

Sports trophies and awards
Professional Darts Corporation